Nicocles (Nikoklēs) was an Ancient Cyprian Greek king of Salamis, Cyprus.  In 374/3 BC, he succeeded his (presumed) father Evagoras I. Nicocles continued the philhellenic politics of his father. Nicocles probably died together with Straton of Sidon during the revolt of satraps (362 to 360 BC). He was followed as the Cypriot king of Salamis by his son Evagoras II.

Some authors have proposed that Nicocles had participated in the conspiracy to which his father Evagoras fell a victim, but there is no authority for this supposition.  Rather this idea seems to have arisen as a means of explaining the strange error made by Diodorus in considering Nicocles as the eunuch who assassinated Evagoras.

Little is known of the reign of Nicocles, but it appears to have been one of peace and prosperity. Based on statements of his panegyrist Isocrates (who addressed two of his orations to him and has made him the subject of another), under his rule his kingdom flourished, he  replenished the treasury, which had been exhausted by his father's wars, without oppressing his subjects with exorbitant taxes, and behaved in all respects as the model of a mild and equitable ruler. Isocrates also extols him for his interest in literature and philosophy, and provides proof of this by noting that Nicocles rewarding Isocrates for his panegyric with the magnificent present of twenty talents (Vit. X. Orat. p. 838, a.). In addition, the orator praises him for the purity of his domestic relations; although Theopompus and Anaximenes of Lampsacus (ap. Athen. xii. p. 531) state that he was a person of luxurious habits who had vied with Straton, king of Sidon, in the splendour and refinement of his feasts and other sensual indulgences. Theopompus and Anaximenes of Lampsacus also state that Nicocles ultimately perished as the result of a violent death, but neither the date nor the circumstances surrounding this event are recorded.

References

Ancient Greek rulers
People from Salamis
Kings of Salamis, Cyprus
4th-century BC Greek people
Year of birth unknown
Year of death unknown